Season 1980–81 was the 97th football season in which Dumbarton competed at a Scottish national level, entering the Scottish Football League for the 75th time, the Scottish Cup for the 86th time and the Scottish League Cup for the 34th time.

Overview 
For the sixth year running, Dumbarton played league football in Division 1, and with Sean Fallon taking over the manager's post, there was some confidence that this season could see a top two finish.  However, despite a promising start, results were mixed, and it was clear by the beginning of the year that any hopes of promotion had gone.  Indeed, things may have been worse had there not been an unbeaten run in the final 6 games, and in the end Dumbarton finished in 8th place with 37 points, 20 behind champions Hibernian.

In the Scottish Cup, Dumbarton beat Premier Division opponents St Mirren in the third round before losing a close encounter in the next round to fellow Division 1 team Motherwell.

It was the same old story however in the League Cup, where Dumbarton lost in the first round, this time to Raith Rovers.

Locally, however, in the Stirlingshire Cup, there was something to cheer, with the silverware returning to Boghead after a final win over Stirling Albion.

Results & fixtures

Scottish First Division

Scottish Cup

Scottish League Cup

Stirlingshire Cup

Pre-season/Other matches

League table

Player statistics

Squad 

|}

Transfers
Amongst those players joining and leaving the club were the following:

Players in

Players out

Reserve team
Dumbarton competed in the Scottish Reserve League First Division (West), winning 6 and drawing 6 of 26 games - finishing 11th of 14.

In the Scottish Second XI Cup, Dumbarton again lost to Dundee United in the fourth round, and in the Reserve League Cup, Dumbarton lost to Partick Thistle in the first round.

Trivia
  The League match against Dunfermline on 9 September marked Joe Coyle's 100th appearance for Dumbarton in all national competitions - the 82nd Dumbarton player to reach this milestone.
  The League match against Motherwell on 27 September marked Ally MacLeod's 100th appearance for Dumbarton in all national competitions - the 83rd Dumbarton player to reach this milestone.
  The Scottish Cup match against Motherwell on 14 February marked John Gallacher's 100th appearance for Dumbarton in all national competitions - the 84th Dumbarton player to reach this milestone.
  The League match against Hamilton on 4 April marked Graeme Sinclair's 200th appearance for Dumbarton in all national competitions - the 15th Dumbarton player to break the 'double century'.
 The signing fee of £13,500 paid to Clyde for Mark Clougherty was a new club record.
 During the season there was an amazing attempt to sign Johan Cruyff on a match-to-match basis.  The £1,500 per match offer was eventually declined in favour of a £1.5 million contract from the USA.
 The disappointing season was in the end to result in Sean Fallon's resignation as manager.

See also
 1980–81 in Scottish football

References

External links
George Brannigan (Dumbarton Football Club Historical Archive)
Billy Hutchinson (Dumbarton Football Club Historical Archive)
Dave Jackson (Dumbarton Football Club Historical Archive)
Jim Martin (Dumbarton Football Club Historical Archive)
Steve Armstrong (Dumbarton Football Club Historical Archive)
Ian Gibson (Dumbarton Football Club Historical Archive)
Joe Kennedy (Dumbarton Football Club Historical Archive)
Scottish Football Historical Archive

Dumbarton F.C. seasons
Scottish football clubs 1980–81 season